OBC may refer to:

Music 
 Original Broadway Cast, a category of Cast recording
 Obscured by Clouds, a 1972 soundtrack album by Pink Floyd
 Barcelona Symphony and Catalonia National Orchestra

Sports 
 Oceania Badminton Confederation
 Olympiacos Basketball Club, widely known as Olympiacos BC, in Greece

Organisations 
 OBC (secret society), at the University of North Carolina at Asheville
 Open Bible Churches
 Order of British Columbia, a Canadian decoration
 Oriental Bank of Commerce, a defunct bank in India
 Osaka Broadcasting Corporation
 Osservatorio Balcani e Caucaso, an Italian think-tank
 Ottmar Beckman Cars AB
 Original Bowling Company, a former name for the UK bowling centre operator Hollywood Bowl Group

Other 
 Officer Basic Course, the U.S. Army's initial training for officers
 Organic and Biomolecular Chemistry, a scientific journal
 Ormond-by-the-Sea, Florida, in Volusia County
 Other Backward Class, a constitutionally recognised socio-economic group by the Indian government for the purpose of affirmative action
 Online Branding Company
 Ocean Bottom Cables, used for reflection seismology in oil and gas exploration
 Ontario Building Code, a version of the National Building Code of Canada used in Ontario
 On Board Charging, use for Battery electric vehicles (BEV) and Plug-in hybrids (PHEV)